"Northern Light" is a song by Swedish musician Basshunter, which appears on his fifth studio album, Calling Time.

Track listing
 Promo CD (May 2012)
 "Northern Light" (Radio Edit) – 2:50
 "Northern Light" (Original Mix) – 3:10
 "Northern Light" (Club Mix) – 5:18
 "Northern Light" (Almighty Remix Edit) – 3:30
 "Northern Light" (Almighty Remix) – 6:07
 "Northern Light" (Almighty Remix Dub) – 6:07
 "Northern Light" (PJ Harmony Remix Edit) – 4:18
 "Northern Light" (PJ Harmony Remix) – 6:04

 Promo CD (2012)
 "Northern Light" (Original Mix) – 3:10
 "Northern Light" (Radio Edit) – 2:50
 "Northern Light" (Club Mix) – 5:18
 "Northern Light" (PJ Harmony Remix) – 4:18
 "Northern Light" (Almighty Remix) – 3:30
 "Northern Light" (Almighty Remix Edit) – 6:07
 "Northern Light" (Almighty Remix Dub) – 6:07
 "Northern Light" (PJ Harmony Remix Edit) – 4:04

 Digital download (2 October 2012)
 "Northern Light" (KleptoMaddox Dubstep Remix) – 3:46

 Remixes
 "Northern Light" (Original Mix) – 3:10
 "Northern Light" (De Rossi Radio Mix) – 2:49
 "Northern Light" (De Rossi Club Mix) – 5:18
 "Northern Light" (PJ Harmony Remix) – 4:18
 "Northern Light" (Almighty Remix) – 3:30
 "Northern Light" (Almighty Remix Edit) – 6:07
 "Northern Light" (Almighty Remix Dub) – 6:07
 "Northern Light" (PJ Harmony Remix Edit) – 4:04

Release history

Music video 
Music video was directed by Alex Herron and uploaded by All Around the World on 27 April 2012.

Charts

Live performances 
Basshunter perform "Northern Light" on 12 May 2012 at Maspalomas Pride 2012, his performance was recorded and released on the box set various artists. Artist singing "Northern Light" and "Boten Anna" on 4 July 2012 at Allsång på Skansen in Stockholm.

References

External links
 

Basshunter songs
2012 singles
2012 songs
Ultra Music singles
All Around the World Productions singles
Songs written by Basshunter
Songs about friendship
Song recordings produced by Basshunter